March 14 - Eastern Orthodox liturgical calendar - March 16

All fixed commemorations below are observed on March 28 by Orthodox Churches on the Old Calendar.

For March 15th, Orthodox Churches on the Old Calendar commemorate the Saints listed on March 2.

Saints

 Apostle Aristobulus of the Seventy, first bishop of Britain (1st century) (see also: March 16)
 Martyrs Agapius, and with him seven martyrs (303):
 Publius (Pauplios); Timolaus; Romulus; two named Dionysius; and two named Alexander; at Caesarea in Palestine.
 Hieromartyr Alexander of Side in Pamphylia (270-275)
 Martyr Nicander of Egypt (305)
 Saint Hebarestes, steward of a church located in Jerusalem.

Pre-Schism Western saints

 Martyr Mancius (5th or 6th century)
 Saint Speciosus, a monk at Terracina in Italy (c. 555)
 Saint Probus of Rieti, Bishop of Rieti in central Italy (c. 571)
 Saint Zachariah, Pope of Rome (752)
 Saint Leocritia (Lucretia), a holy virgin in Cordoba in Spain (859)

Post-Schism Orthodox saints

 Saint Nicander, monk, of Gorodetsk, Nizhni-Novgorod (1603)
 New Martyr Manuel of Crete (1792)
 Hieromartyr Parthenios, Deacon, at Didymoteicho (1805)

New martyrs and confessors

 New Hieromartyr Alexis Vinogradov, Protopresbyter of Novotroitskoye, Tver (1938)
 New Hieromartyr Demetrius Legeydo, Priest of Chimkent (1938)
 New Hieromartyr Michael Bogoslovsky, Protopresbyter of Simferopol-Crimea (1940)

Other commemorations

 Commemoration of the deliverance of the island of Lefkada from the earthquake of 1938.

Icon gallery

Notes

References

Sources
 March 15/March 28. Orthodox Calendar (PRAVOSLAVIE.RU).
 March 28 / March 15. HOLY TRINITY RUSSIAN ORTHODOX CHURCH (A parish of the Patriarchate of Moscow).
 Complete List of Saints. Protection of the Mother of God Church (POMOG).
 March 15. OCA - The Lives of the Saints.
 The Autonomous Orthodox Metropolia of Western Europe and the Americas (ROCOR). St. Hilarion Calendar of Saints for the year of our Lord 2004. St. Hilarion Press (Austin, TX). p. 22.
 March 15. Latin Saints of the Orthodox Patriarchate of Rome.
 The Roman Martyrology. Transl. by the Archbishop of Baltimore. Last Edition, According to the Copy Printed at Rome in 1914. Revised Edition, with the Imprimatur of His Eminence Cardinal Gibbons. Baltimore: John Murphy Company, 1916. pp. 76–77.
Greek Sources
 Great Synaxaristes:  15 ΜΑΡΤΙΟΥ. ΜΕΓΑΣ ΣΥΝΑΞΑΡΙΣΤΗΣ.
  Συναξαριστής. 15 Μαρτίου. ECCLESIA.GR. (H ΕΚΚΛΗΣΙΑ ΤΗΣ ΕΛΛΑΔΟΣ).
Russian Sources
  28 марта (15 марта). Православная Энциклопедия под редакцией Патриарха Московского и всея Руси Кирилла (электронная версия). (Orthodox Encyclopedia - Pravenc.ru).
  15 марта (ст.ст.) 28 марта 2013 (нов. ст.). Русская Православная Церковь Отдел внешних церковных связей. (DECR).

March in the Eastern Orthodox calendar